The Keysborough Football Netball Club is a semi-professional Australian rules football club in the southern suburbs of Melbourne. The club participates in the Southern Football Netball League.

History
Formed in 1947, the Burras joined the Dandenong District 'B' grade competition. In 1948 the club won its first premiership with a victory over Officer, 15.13 103 to 12.12 84. Promoted into 'A' grade in 1950 the club stayed there until the DDFL folded at the end of 1953. In 1954 the club joined the Croydon Ferntree Gully FL and stay for four seasons.
In 1958 The club transferred to the South West Gippsland FL, it took only four year before premiership glory to returned to the club. The club saluted again in 1964 and 1965 and again later in 1976.

When the clubs in the Casey Cardinia Division decided in 2015, to break away from the Mornington Nepean FL, Keysborough decide to join the Southern Football Netball League instead. It was accepted and commenced in 2nd Division.

Senior Premierships
Dandenong District Football League B grade.
 1948
 South West Gippsland Football League
  1962, 1964, 1965, 1976.

VFL/AFL players
 Reg Kent - 
 Leigh Capsalis - 
 Chris Bryan - , 
 Peter Ryan - South Melbourne

References

External links
 Official website

Southern Football League (Victoria)
Australian rules football clubs in Melbourne
1947 establishments in Australia
Australian rules football clubs established in 1947
Sport in the City of Greater Dandenong